Mall Wala, also spelled Mal Wala, Mallwala or Malwala, is a village of Talwandi Sabo tehsil of Bathinda district of Indian Panjab. The surrounding villages includes Bhukhianwali.

Geography 

The surrounding villages includes Bhukhianwali, Dunne Wala and Gurthari.

Demographics 

Punjabi is the mother tongue and Sikhism is the dominant religion of the village. As of 2011 census, it has total population of 2,737 with 531 households, 1,433 males and 1,304 females. The sex ratio is 910 females per thousand males, which is higher than the Punjabi sex ratio of 895, with children sex ratio of 914. The literacy rate is 60.86% with male literacy of 69.13% and female, 51.76%. The Schedule Caste constitutes 44.46% of the population with no Scheduled Tribe population.

References 

Villages in Bathinda district